Nathan Parker is an English screenwriter.

He was nominated for a British Independent Film Award for Best Screenplay at the British Independent Film Awards 2009 and a BAFTA Award for Outstanding British Film at the 63rd British Academy Film Awards for the 2009 film Moon, and a Canadian Screen Award for Best Adapted Screenplay at the 7th Canadian Screen Awards for the 2018 film Our House.

In addition to his screenplays, he directed the short film Remember Alice Bell? in 2011.

He is the son of filmmaker Alan Parker (1944–2020).

Filmography
Moon (2009)
Blitz (2011)
Remember Alice Bell? (2011)
Equals (2015)
2:22 (2017)
Our House (2018)
Slingshot (TBA)

References

External links

21st-century British male writers
21st-century British screenwriters
British film directors
Hugo Award-winning writers
Living people
Year of birth missing (living people)